Railroad Rhythm is a 1937 short animated film by Columbia Pictures starring the comic strip character Krazy Kat, and part of a long-running series of short films featuring the character.

Plot
Krazy is a train engineer, driving an old train. While Krazy enjoys himself and even sings I've Been Working on the Railroad, the passengers are disoriented by the coaches tilting back and forth. When the train stops at a station, the passengers exit, express their dislike of the ride, before boarding a more modern train at the place.

As Krazy continues to run his train, a villainous mutt, some miles ahead, ties a man and a woman, who are a couple, onto the track. Krazy, however, notices the restrained couple on time. Krazy dives his train into the ground, going under them, before getting back to the surface. Krazy comes out of the train to untie the couple. The man gives Krazy a sack of cash as a sign of gratitude.

Krazy uses the money he received from the man to purchase one of the modern trains. The man and the woman are onboard as passengers. But troubles are not over as the mutt returns in an airplane to drop bombs on the train. The couple, however, is not defenseless as the man uses a trumpet to summon an army tank to the scene. After firing several rounds, the airplane is eventually shot down.

Reception
Motion Picture Exhibitor (Dec 1, 1937): "The cat is engineer of an old train. The passengers are sick from the constant rocking and ride the new streamlined train. The cat and the porter (mimic of Stephin Fetchit) save a band leader and his girlfriend from death, receive as reward enough cash to buy a streamlined train. The animation is good but the gags are a little weak. Fair."

Selected Motion Pictures (Jan 1, 1938): "Krazy Kat rescues his sweetheart from the villain in an old-time melodrama with a modern ending. Clever and amusing cartoon."

See also
 Krazy Kat filmography

References

External links
Railroad Rhythm at the Big Cartoon Database

1937 short films
American animated short films
American black-and-white films
1937 animated films
Krazy Kat shorts
Columbia Pictures short films
1930s American animated films
Columbia Pictures animated short films
Screen Gems short films
Animated films about trains